Trumbull Township is one of the twenty-seven townships of Ashtabula County, Ohio, United States. The 2010 census found 1,408 people in the township.

Geography
Located on the western edge of the county, it borders the following townships:
Harpersfield Township - north
Austinburg Township - northeast corner
Morgan Township - east
Rome Township - southeast corner
Hartsgrove Township - south
Montville Township, Geauga County - southwest corner
Thompson Township, Geauga County - west
Madison Township, Lake County - northwest corner

No municipalities are located in Trumbull Township, although the unincorporated community of Footville lies in the township's southwest. Two other old unincorporated communities lie farther east: Center Trumbull and East Trumbull.

Name and history
It is the only Trumbull Township statewide.

The first Euro-American settlers in what is now Trumbull Township were Holly and Hannah Tanner, who came from the town of Scipio, New York. Because they soon left, the first permanent resident was Daniel Woodruff, who came from New York in 1818.

Trumbull Township was organized in 1825.

Government
The township is governed by a three-member board of trustees, who are elected in November of odd-numbered years to a four-year term beginning on the following January 1. Two are elected in the year after the presidential election and one is elected in the year before it. There is also an elected township fiscal officer, who serves a four-year term beginning on April 1 of the year after the election, which is held in November of the year before the presidential election. Vacancies in the fiscal officership or on the board of trustees are filled by the remaining trustees.  Currently, the board is composed of chairman Ron Tamburino and members Willis Clay and John McMahon.

References

External links
Township website
County website

Townships in Ashtabula County, Ohio
Townships in Ohio